This is a list of years in Singapore. See also Timeline of Singaporean history.

19th century

20th century

21st century

 
Singapore history-related lists
Singapore